is a Japanese voice actress affiliated with Aoni Production.

Biography
In May 2015, she married fellow voice-actor, Takeshi Kusao and they have a child born in 2018.

She announced on her Twitter that she gave birth to a second child on November 13 2021.

Filmography

Anime
2009
 Student Council's Discretion as Chizuru Akaba
 Umineko no Naku Koro ni as Lucifer

2010
 Shiki as Aoi Muto

2011
 Bakugan Battle Brawlers: Gundalian Invaders as Zenet Surrow
 Deadman Wonderland as En
 Shakugan no Shana Final as Hildegard

2012
 Campione! as Ena Seishuin
 High School DxD as Mira
 Sakura Trick as Megumi, Kaede's younger brother
Ground Control to Psychoelectric Girl as Tōe Ōi, Yamamoto (young)

2014
 Witch Craft Works as Ofuku, Evoque
 The Irregular at Magic High School as Subaru Satomi
 One Piece as Cotton
 A Good Librarian Like a Good Shepherd as Tamamo Sakuraba

2015
 Beautiful Bones: Sakurako's Investigation as Hitoe Madoka

2016
 Gate as Misery
 One Piece as Milky

2017
 The Silver Guardian as Riku Lei
 Dragon Ball Super as Roasie

2018
 Junji Ito Collection as Sayuri Tsujii, Midori Shibayama, Rie, Kinuko Hidaka, Nana Horie, Maiko Hosotani, Yue
Persona 5: The Animation as Tae Takemi

2019
 Rifle is Beautiful as Yayoi Hayamine

2022
 Boruto: Naruto Next Generations as Sōsha Amino

Original video animation
 Baby Princess (2011), Mizore Amatsuka

Video games
 Ōgon Musōkyoku (2010), Lucifer
 Umineko no Naku Koro ni: Majo to Suiri no Rondo (2010), Lucifer
 Valkyria Chronicles 2 (2010), Lotte Netzel, Sofia Collins
 Rune Factory 4 (2012), Illuminata 
 Samurai Warriors: Chronicles 2nd (2012), Naotora Ii
 God Eater 2 (2013), Fran de Bourgogne
 The Idolmaster Million Live! (mobile) (2013), Subaru Nagayoshi
 Toukiden: The Age of Demons (2013), Yuu
 Deception IV: Blood Ties (2014), Laegrinna
 Samurai Warriors 4 (2014), Naotora Ii
 Dead or Alive 5 Last Round (2016), Naotora Ii
 Persona 5 (2016), Tae Takemi
 Samurai Warriors: Spirit of Sanada (2016), Naotora Ii, Yukimura Sanada (child)
 Musou Stars (2017), Naotora Ii, Laegrinna
 Valkyria Chronicles 4 (2018), Karen Stewart
 Arknights (2022), Cantabile

Dubbing
 4.3.2.1., Cassandra
 The Derby Stallion, Tammy McCardle
 Easy A, Marianne Bryant
 Freezer, Alisa
 The Groomsmen, Tina 
 The Mentalist, Grace Van Pelt (Amanda Righetti)
 Private Valentine: Blonde & Dangerous, Dolores
 Robin Hood, Marian
 Swamp Shark, Krystal Bouchard

References

External links
 Official agency profile 
 
 Interview with Yuka Saito 

1986 births
Living people
Aoni Production voice actors
Japanese video game actresses
Japanese voice actresses
Voice actresses from Fukushima Prefecture
21st-century Japanese actresses